The Gwichʼin language belongs to the Athabaskan language family and is spoken by the Gwich'in First Nation (Canada) / Alaska Native People (United States). It is also known in older or dialect-specific publications as Kutchin, Takudh, Tukudh, or Loucheux. Gwich'in is spoken primarily in the towns of Inuvik, Aklavik, Fort McPherson, and Tsiigehtchic (formerly Arctic Red River), all in the Northwest Territories and Old Crow in Yukon of Canada. In Alaska of the United States, Gwichʼin is spoken in Beaver, Circle, Fort Yukon, Chalkyitsik, Birch Creek, Arctic Village, Eagle, and Venetie.

Written Gwichʼin 
The missionary Robert McDonald first started working on the written representation of Van Tat and Dagoo dialects Gwichʼin. He also produced a Bible and a hymn book which was written in Gwichʼin in 1898. McDonald used English orthography as his model when representing Gwichʼin. This was unusual for missionaries at the time: other missionaries were translating the Bible from French into languages such as northern Slavey. After 1960, Wycliffe Bible translator Richard Mueller introduced a new modified spelling system. The purpose of his writing system was to better distinguish the sounds of the Gwichʼin language. Later on, Mueller's writing system was officially adopted by the Yukon Territory. The new writing system helped preserve the Gwichʼin language: previously, young people found it difficult to understand written Gwichʼin.

Current status 
Few Gwichʼin speak their heritage language as a majority of the population shifts to English. According to the UNESCO Interactive Atlas of the World's Languages in Danger, Gwichʼin is now "severely endangered." There are about 260 Gwichʼin speakers in Canada out of a total Gwichʼin population of 1,900. About 300 out of a total Alaska Gwichʼin population of 1,100 speak the language.

In 1988, the NWT Official Languages Act named Gwich'in as an official language of the Northwest Territories, and the Official Languages of Alaska Law as amended declared Gwich'in a recognized language in 2014.

The Gwich'in language is taught regularly at the Chief Zzeh Gittlit School in Old Crow, Yukon.

Projects are underway to document the language and enhance the writing and translation skills of younger Gwich'in speakers. In one project, lead research associate and fluent speaker Gwichʼin elder Kenneth Frank works with linguists and young Gwich'in speakers affiliated with the Alaska Native Language Center at the University of Alaska in Fairbanks to document traditional knowledge of caribou anatomy (Mishler and Frank 2020).

Endangerment factors

Residential schools 
Gwich’in is spoken by many First Nations and residential schools played a factor in creating a cultural disruption and a language shift. During the time that residential schools were open their main goal was to change the way indigenous communities operated entirely. Another goal of the residential schools was to wipe out the indigenous culture and replace it with the European culture, also causing the indigenous children to abandon their heritage language. This process was done by taking the children away from their families and placing them in a school. Fortunately, the Gwich’in and the Dinjii Zhuh culture did survive the residential schools. Residential schools were a big situation that had and do still cause cultural disruptions.

Dialects
There are two main dialects of Gwichʼin, eastern and western, which are delineated roughly at the Canada–US border. There are several dialects within these subgroupings, including Fort Yukon Gwichʼin, Arctic Village Gwichʼin, Western Canada Gwichʼin (Takudh, Tukudh, Loucheux), and Arctic Red River. Each village has unique dialect differences, idioms, and expressions. The Old Crow people in the northern Yukon have approximately the same dialect as those bands living in Venetie and Arctic Village, Alaska.

Gwich’in speakers located in Old Crow speak several dialects including Kâachik and Tâachik. They are spoken in Johnson Creek village.

Phonology

Consonants

The consonants of Gwichʼin in the standard orthography are listed below (with IPA notation in brackets):

Vowels

 Nasal vowels are marked with an ogonek, e.g. [ą]
 Low tone is marked with a grave accent, e.g. [à]
 High tone is never marked

Grammar

Verb configuration
A verb in Gwich’in contains smaller word parts that come together to make a verb. A verb can be composed by using a stem, which is then accompanied by smaller word parts, i.e. prefixes. A prefix gives off a lot of information. It informs an individual about whether the word is in the past or present tense. A prefix can also inform the individual about the number of people participating. The stem can be found at the end of the word and the prefix follows right behind the stem when reading a verb read from the right to left, so full understanding is obtained.

In Popular Culture 
 In the PBS Kids television show Molly of Denali, the main character Molly comes from a family of Gwich'in background, and therefore uses words in the Gwich'in language such as 'Mahsi' Choo' throughout the show.

References

Further reading

 Firth, William G., et al. Gwìndòo Nànhʼ Kak Geenjit Gwichʼin Ginjik = More Gwichʼin Words About the Land. Inuvik, N.W.T.: Gwichʼin Renewable Resource Board, 2001.
 Gwichʼin Renewable Resource Board. Nànhʼ Kak Geenjit Gwichʼin Ginjik = Gwichʼin Words About the Land. Inuvik, N.W.T., Canada: Gwichʼin Renewable Resource Board, 1997.
 McDonald. A Grammar of the Tukudh Language. Yellowknife, N.W.T.: Curriculum Division, Dept. of Education, Government of the Northwest Territories, 1972.
Mishler, Craig, ed. Neerihiinjìk: We Traveled From Place to Place: The Gwich’in Stories of Johnny and Sarah Frank. 2nd ed. Fairbanks: Alaska Native Language Center, 2001.
Mishler, Craig and Kenneth Frank, eds. Dinjii Vadzaih Dhidlit: The Man Who Became a Caribou. 2nd ed. Hanover, N.H.: IPI Press, 2020.
 Montgomery, Jane. Gwichʼin Language Lessons Old Crow Dialect. Whitehorse: Yukon Native Language Centre, 1994.
 Northwest Territories. Gwichʼin Legal Terminology. [Yellowknife, N.W.T.]: Dept. of Justice, Govt. of the Northwest Territories, 1993.
 Norwegian-Sawyer, Terry. Gwichʼin Language Lessons Gwichyàh Gwichʼin Dialect (Tsiigèhchik–Arctic Red River). Whitehorse: Yukon Native Language Centre, 1994.
 Peter, Katherine, and Mary L. Pope. Dinjii Zhuu Gwandak = Gwichʼin Stories. [Anchorage]: Alaska State-Operated Schools, Bilingual Programs, 1974.
 Peter, Katherine. A Book of Gwichʼin Athabaskan Poems. College, Alaska: Alaska Native Language Center, Center for Northern Educational Research, University of Alaska, 1974.
 Scollon, Ronald. A Sketch of Kutchin Phonology. University of Hawaii, 1975.
 Yukon Native Language Centre. Gwichʼin Listening Exercises Teetlʼit Gwichʼin dialect''. Whitehorse: Yukon Native Language Centre, Yukon College, 2003.

External links

Gwich’in Archived: Yukon Native Language Centre: Gwichʼin
Alaska Native Language Center: Gwichʼin
Ettunetle Tutthug Enjit Gichinchik  Portions of the Anglican Book of Common Prayer in Gwichʼin
Gwich'in Language Dictionary , 2003, 4th Edition, prepared by the Gwich'in Social & Cultural Institute and the Gwich'in Language Centre, Tsiigehtchic and Fort McPherson, Northwest Territories (Canada); covers two dialects: Teetl'it Gwich'in (Fort McPherson) and Gwichyah Gwich'in (Tsiigehtchic)
Gwich'in Junior Dictionary/Dinjii zhuh ginjik nagwan tr'iłtsąįį , 1979, compiled by Katherine Peter, Alaska Native Language Center

Gwich'in
Northern Athabaskan languages
Indigenous languages of the North American Subarctic
Indigenous languages of Alaska
First Nations languages in Canada
Official languages of Alaska